Andrew Nigel Murray Longmore (24 September 1953 – 11 April 2019) was an English first-class cricketer and sports journalist.

Longmore was born at Woolwich in September 1953. He was educated at Twyford School, before going up to Worcester College, Oxford. While studying at Oxford, he made two appearances in first-class cricket for Oxford University against Derbyshire in 1973 and Worcestershire in 1975. Playing as a wicket-keeper in the Oxford side, he scored 28 runs with a high score of 15.

After graduating from Oxford, Longmore became a sports journalist, with his first role being at The Cricketer in the early 1980s. He was chief sportswriter for the Independent on Sunday, before becoming a senior sportswriter at The Sunday Times in 2003, from which he retired in 2018. He won the Sports Journalists' Association Olympic/Paralympic Reporter category in 2000 for his coverage of the Summer Olympics, while in 2003 he won Feature Writer of the Year. He was the biographer for the jockey Kieren Fallon, writing his biography alongside Henrietta Knight. Longmore died in his sleep while on a walking holiday in the South of France in April 2019.

References

External links

1953 births
2019 deaths
People from Woolwich
People educated at Twyford School
Alumni of Worcester College, Oxford
English cricketers
Oxford University cricketers
English sportswriters
English biographers
The Sunday Times people
The Independent people